The 1991–92 Lebanese Premier League season was the 32nd season of the Lebanese Premier League, the top Lebanese professional league for association football clubs in the country, established in 1934.

Ansar, the defending champions, won their fourth consecutive—and overall—Lebanese Premier League title.

League table

Group A

Group B

Relegation play-out

|}

Championship play-off

|}

External links
RSSSF

Leb
1991–92 in Lebanese football
Lebanese Premier League seasons